Raúl Cancio (18 September 1911 – 23 October 1961) was a Spanish film actor, screenwriter and film director. Cancio acted in more than sixty five films including Raza (1942). He also directed two films, a 1952 documentary and a 1950 feature film.

Selected filmography

Actor
 Raza (1942)
 Blood in the Snow (1942)
 House of Cards (1943)
 Public Trial (1946)
 The Troublemaker (1950)
 Tales of the Alhambra (1950)
 Agustina of Aragon (1950)
 Black Sky (1951)
 The Girl at the Inn (1951)
 The Great Galeoto (1951)
 The Floor Burns (1952)
 Flight 971 (1953)
 The Cheerful Caravan (1953)
 Adventures of the Barber of Seville (1954)
 Fedra (1956)
 Let's Make the Impossible! (1958)
College Boarding House (1959)
 They Fired with Their Lives (1959)
 The Football Lottery (1960)

Screenwriter
 Follow the Legion (1942)

References

Bibliography 
 Pavlović, Tatjana. 100 Years of Spanish Cinema.  John Wiley & Sons, 2009.

External links 
 

1911 births
1961 deaths
Spanish film directors
Spanish male screenwriters
Spanish male film actors
20th-century Spanish male actors
20th-century Spanish screenwriters
20th-century Spanish male writers